Eugnosta subsynaetera is a species of moth of the family Tortricidae. It is found in Brazil (Goias).

The wingspan is about 15 mm. The ground colour of the forewings is creamy, somewhat tinged with pale ochreous and with large pearl white areas in the dorsal and terminal parts of the wing.

References

Moths described in 2002
Eugnosta